Sophia Chan Siu-chee  (born 1958) is a Hong Kong professor and politician. She served as Secretary for Food and Health from 2017 to 2022.

She was educated at the St. Paul's Secondary School. She subsequently graduated from the University of Manchester with a Master of Education, the Harvard University with a Master of Public Health and the University of Hong Kong with a Doctor of Philosophy Degree. She was a Professor in Nursing and Director of Research in HKU's School of Nursing and an Assistant Dean of the Li Ka Shing Faculty of Medicine of HKU.

She was involved in tobacco control and smoking cessation promotion and was a consultant to the World Health Organization on training health-care professionals in tobacco dependency treatment interventions through advocacy and education.

In 2012, she was appointed as the Under Secretary for Food and Health. In 2017, she was appointed Secretary for Food and Health of the administration of Carrie Lam.

Subsequently, in 2018 she declined to speak in support of banning bear-bile products, the production of which is considered inhumane and cruel, in Hong Kong.

In February 2021, Chan gave approval for emergency use of the Sinovac vaccine, and granted it an exemption from a rule that stated vaccines must have third phase clinical trial data published in a journal.

In April 2021, Chan briefed varies industries (catering, agriculture and fisheries, Chinese medicine, and health services) on why the NPCSC implemented rules to only allow "patriots" to serve in the government, and asked for their full support. In addition, she said that she fully supports the changes. In December 2021, Chan claimed that having only "patriots" serve in the government would help the global fight against COVID-19.

On 31 December 2021, Chan warned the public not to gather in large groups; hours later, she attended the Hong Kong Dental Association's annual ball, as the guest of honor.

In March 2022, Chan said that a COVID-19 lockdown in Hong Kong had not been ruled out, contradicting an earlier statement by Carrie Lam, who said that a lockdown would not happen. The contradiction caused rumors and panic-buying at grocery stores and pharmacies. Chan also said that traditional Chinese medicine could prevent Covid-19.

In November 2022, Chan said that the government was not underprepared for the city's fifth wave, and when asked if the administration should apologize to relatives of those who died, Chan said it was time for people to move on.

References

1958 births
Living people
Government officials of Hong Kong
Hong Kong civil servants
Alumni of the University of Manchester
Alumni of the University of Hong Kong
Academic staff of the University of Hong Kong
Harvard School of Public Health alumni
Members of the Executive Council of Hong Kong
Recipients of the Gold Bauhinia Star